Potassium hexacyanochromate(III) is an inorganic compound with the formula K3[Cr(CN)6]. It consists of three potassium cations and [Cr(CN)6]3− anion.  It is a yellow, air-stable, paramagnetic solid. It is isomorphous with potassium ferricyanide.

Synthesis and reactions
The salt is prepared by treating chromium(III) salts with KCN.

Reduction of hexacyanochromate(III) gives the Cr(II) and Cr(0) derivatives, [Cr(CN)6]4- and [Cr(CN)6]6-, respectively.

References 

Potassium compounds
Chromium complexes
Cyanometallates
Chromium(III) compounds